The 2011 Longines Royal International Horse Show was the 2011 edition of the Royal International Horse Show, the British official show jumping horse show at All England Jumping Course at Hickstead. It was held as CSIO 5* and CDI 5*.

The 2011 edition of the Royal International Horse Show was held between 28 and 31 July 2011.

FEI Nations Cup of the United Kingdom 
The 2011 FEI Nations Cup of the United Kingdom was part of the 2011 Royal International Horse Show. It was the seventh competition of the 2011 Meydan FEI Nations Cup.

The 2011 FEI Nations Cup of the United Kingdom was held on Friday 29 July 2011 at 2:15 pm. The competing teams were: France, Great Britain, the Netherlands, Ireland, Belgium, Denmark, Germany and the United States of America.

The competition was a show jumping competition with two rounds and optionally one jump-off. The height of the fences were up to 1.60 meters. The competition was endowed with 200,000 €.

(grey penalties points do not count for the team result)

Grand Prix Spécial (B-Final)
The 2011 Royal International Horse Show was the venue of the third competition of the World Dressage Masters (WDM) - rider ranking, season 2011/2012.

All competitors started first in the Grand Prix de Dressage at Saturday. The eight best-placed competitors of the Grand Prix de Dressage were allowed to start in the A-Final (the Grand Prix Freestyle). It some of best-placed competitors wanted to start in the B-Final, the same number of competitors, who were placed after the best-placed competitors, moved up in the A-Final.

The B-Final of the World Dressage Masters competitions at 2011 Royal International Horse Show was held on Sunday 31 July 2011. It was endowed with 20,000 €. The B-Final was held as Grand Prix Spécial, the competition with the highest definite level of dressage competitions.

(top 3 of 12 competitors)

Grand Prix Freestyle (A-Final) 
The Grand Prix Freestyle (or Grand Prix Kür) was the A-Final of the World Dressage Masters competitions at 2011 Royal International Horse Show (see also Grand Prix Spécial).

A Grand Prix Freestyle was a Freestyle dressage competition. The level of this competition was at least the level of a Grand Prix de Dressage, but it can be higher than the level of a Grand Prix Spécial.

The Grand Prix Freestyle at 2011 Royal International Horse Show was held on Sunday 31 July 2011 after the Grand Prix Spécial. It was endowed with 70,000 €.

(top 3 of 8 competitors)

The Longines King Georges V Gold Cup 
The King Georges V Gold Cup, the Show jumping Grand Prix of the 2011 Royal International Horse Show, was the major show jumping competition at this event. The sponsor of this competition was Longines. It was held on Sunday 31 July 2011. The competition was a show jumping competition with one round and one jump-off, the height of the fences were up to 1.60 meters.

It is endowed with 200,000 €.

(Top 5 of 46 Competitors)

References

External links 
 
 2011 show jumping results
 2011 dressage results

Royal International Horse Show
Royal International Horse Show
Royal International Horse Show
2011 in British sport